Vila Nova de Poiares is a municipality in the Coimbra district, in Portugal. The population in 2011 was 7,281, in an area of 84.45 km².

Parishes
Administratively, the municipality is divided into 4 civil parishes (freguesias):
 Arrifana
 Lavegadas
 Santo André de Poiares
 São Miguel de Poiares

International relations

Vila Nova de Poiares is twinned with:

  Mielec in Poland 

Douchy-Les-Mines, France

References

External links

 Photos from Vila Nova de Poiares

Towns in Portugal
Municipalities of Coimbra District